
Santa Margarida may refer to:

Places

Brazil
 Santa Margarida, Minas Gerais, a municipality
 Santa Margarida do Sul, a municipality in state of Rio Grande do Sul

Portugal
 Aldeia de Santa Margarida, in the municipality of Idanha-a-Nova
 Santa Margarida da Coutada, in the municipality of Constância
 Santa Margarida da Serra, in the municipality of Grândola
 Santa Margarida de Lousada, in the municipality of Lousada

Spain
 Santa Margarida (volcano), in Garrotxa, Catalonia
 Santa Margarida de Montbui, a municipality in Anoia, Catalonia
 Santa Margarida i els Monjos, a municipality in Alt Penedès, Catalonia

See also
Margarida
Santa Margarita (disambiguation)
Saint Margaret (disambiguation)